Cypress Court is a bungalow court located at 623–641 N. Madison Ave. in Pasadena, California. The court consists of eight houses surrounding two central walkways. The homes are designed in the Colonial Revival style and feature gable roofs and gabled porches supported by columns. Contractor Arthur G. Gehrig built the court in 1928.

The court was added to the National Register of Historic Places on July 11, 1983.

References

External links

Bungalow courts
Houses in Pasadena, California
Houses completed in 1928
Houses on the National Register of Historic Places in California
National Register of Historic Places in Pasadena, California
Colonial Revival architecture in California